Sophie Charlotte Ducker (née von Klemperer)  (9 April 1909 – 20 May 2004) was a German-born Australian botanist.  She was awarded the Mueller Medal in 1996.

Early life and education 
Sophie Charlotte von Klemperer was born in Berlin on 9 April 1909. She was the daughter of Victor von Klemperer, a Jewish German who converted to Christianity upon marriage, and his wife Sophie von Klemperer (née Reichenheim). 

Sophie grew up in Dresden and later studied at the Cheltenham Ladies' College in England. She began the study of botany at the University of Geneva and the University of Stuttgart. She stopped her studies in 1931 when she married Dr Johann Friedrich Ducker, known as Friedrich. The couple’s only son, Klaus Heinrich Ducker, was born in Hamburg on 22 September 1933. Sophie also had a stepson, Hanfried Ducker, from her husband’s previous marriage.  

The family faced persecution under the Third Reich due to Sophie’s Jewish heritage and their anti-Nazi sentiments. Friedrich Ducker was forced to resign from his employment after he refused to divorce his wife. The family left Germany at the outbreak of hostilities and moved to Tehran, Iran. They were unable to bring Hanfried as his passport was seized by Nazi Authorities within days of the families’ departure. 

On 17 September 1941, Friedrich Ducker was arrested by the British Military Authorities and interred as an enemy alien. Sophie petitioned to accompany her husband with their young son and was also arrested. The family were later brought to Australia where they were interred at Tatura.

The family faced much persecution at the hands of the other German internees for their anti-Nazi sentiments. Cruel tricks were played on them and they were prevented from attending film nights. Young Klaus was so badly affected by the ill treatment that he was released from internment and sent to boarding school in Melbourne. 

On 3 February 1944, Sophie gave birth to a stillborn daughter, Catherine Sophie Ducker, at Waranga Hospital in Goulburn. The baby was buried at Tatura Cemetery the following day and later moved to Tatura (German) Military Cemetery.

After recovering from the birth, Sophie returned to the camp where circumstances continued to deteriorate. The couple eventually successfully petitioned for their release and remained living in Australia.

Career 
Sophie worked as a research assistant for Ethel Irene McLennan of the botany school at the University of Melbourne. She completed a BSc there in 1952. In 1957, she became a botany lecturer at the university and, in 1961, a senior lecturer. She specialized in marine botany, especially algae. Her eldest husband Friedrich died in Melbourne in 1972. Sophie retired in 1974 but continued to conduct research, present papers and lecture. 

After her retirement, Sophie collaborated with Professor Bruce Knox at the University of Melbourne on pollination, particularly that of seagrasses. Sophie received a DSc from the University of Melbourne in 1978. She also published biographies of early Australian botanists. 

Sophie was a founding member of the Australasian Society for Phycology and Aquatic Botany.

Awards 
In 1993, Sophie was awarded an Honorary Doctor of Laws from the University of Melbourne. She received the Australian and New Zealand Association for the Advancement of Science's Mueller Medal in 1996. She was appointed Member of the Order of Australia (AM) in the 1997 Queen's Birthday Honours for "service to recording the history of botany in Australia, to education and to science, particularly in the field of marine botany".

Death 
Sophie died at her home in Melbourne at the age of 95. She was survived by her son Klaus, daughter-in-law Judith, two grandchildren and two great grandchildren.

References

Further reading 
Ducker, Sophie. The contented botanist: letters of W.H. Harvey about Australia and the Pacific.  Carlton: Melbourne University Press, 1984.  

Ducker, Sophie C. 'Harvey, William Henry (1811–1866)', Australian Dictionary of Biography, National Centre of Biography, Australian National University, http://adb.anu.edu.au/biography/harvey-william-henry-3732/text5867, published first in hardcopy 1972, accessed online 25 August 2017

External links 
 
 Sophie Ducker, University of Melbourne Archives
 Sophie Ducker Botany Collection, Special Collections, University of Melbourne Library

1909 births
2004 deaths
20th-century Australian botanists
University of Melbourne alumni
Academic staff of the University of Melbourne
Women botanists
German women scientists
Australian women scientists
20th-century Australian historians
University of Melbourne women
Women historians
Members of the Order of Australia
20th-century Australian women scientists
German emigrants to Australia